Clyde Whitlock King (September 6, 1898 – August 20, 1982) was an American rower who competed in the 1920 Summer Olympics.

King was born in Montezuma, Iowa. In 1920, he was part of the American boat from the United States Naval Academy (USNA), which won the gold medal in the men's eight.

He graduated from USNA in 1922, served during World War II and Korea, and rose to the rank of rear admiral. King died in Mill Valley, California, and is buried with his wife Marjorie in Golden Gate National Cemetery.

References

External links
 
 

1898 births
1982 deaths
People from Montezuma, Iowa
United States Navy personnel of World War II
Olympic gold medalists for the United States in rowing
Rowers at the 1920 Summer Olympics
United States Naval Academy alumni
United States Navy rear admirals (lower half)
American male rowers
Burials at Golden Gate National Cemetery
Medalists at the 1920 Summer Olympics
Military personnel from Iowa